Titus Okere was a Nigerian footballer who was selected as a member of the "U.K. tourists", a touring team that represented Nigerian in 1949. In the U.K., the team played matches with English amateur clubs and later played an international match against Sierra Leone, with Okere scoring one of the goals in a 2-0 victory.

Life
Okere was born in Ngor Okpala local Government in Owerri, Imo State. He attended St. Cyprian’s Anglican School, Port Harcourt, Kalabari National College and the Okrika Grammar School. During a tour of Azikiwe's athletic club, Okere impressed Azikiwe and he briefly played for ZAC (Zik's Athletic Club) Port Harcourt before leaving for Lagos to join Lagos Railways. Okere captained Railways in 1948 during a successful period where they won trophies. He then moved to Swindon Town F.C. in the U.K, but his stay there was not successful. However, he captained the Nigerian squad against Gold Coast in 1951.

Notes

Sources

Nigerian footballers
Association footballers not categorized by position
Sportspeople from Imo State